Streptomyces zinciresistens is a filamentous bacterium species from the genus of Streptomyces which has been isolated from a copper and zinc mine in the Shaanxi province in China. Streptomyces zinciresistens is resistant against zinc.

See also 
 List of Streptomyces species

References

External links
Type strain of Streptomyces zinciresistens at BacDive -  the Bacterial Diversity Metadatabase

Further reading 
 
 

zinciresistens
Bacteria described in 2011